Maged A. Abdelaziz (born 1954) was the United Nations Secretary-General's Special Adviser on Africa at the level of Under-Secretary-General between 2012 and 2017. He was an Egyptian diplomat who had been Egypt's Permanent Representative to the United Nations since January 2005.  He is married and has one daughter.

References

Egyptian diplomats
1954 births
Living people
Permanent Representatives of Egypt to the United Nations
Under-Secretaries-General of the United Nations
Egyptian officials of the United Nations